The Utah Kid may refer to:

 The Utah Kid (1930 film). an American Western film directed by Richard Thorpe
 The Utah Kid (1944 film). an American Western film directed by Vernon Keays
 "The Utah Kid", a fictional deceased outlaw whose missing loot is central to the plot of "Angry Town", a 1960 episode of the Western TV series "Tales of Wells Fargo".